The Vyapari are a Muslim community found in the state of Gujarat in India . Many members of Vyapari Muslim community migrated to Pakistan after the independence in 1947 and settled in Karachi.

History and origin 

The word vyapar in Hindi and Gujarati means to trade, and the community derives its name from their occupation of trading in cattle and oxen. According to their traditions, they are Muslim converts from the Bania caste. They are mainly distributed in Viramgam and Dholkha in Ahmadabad District and Surendarnagar District. The community speak Gujarati mixed with Urdu.

Present circumstances 
The community is divided into a number of biradaris or clans, the main ones being the Khansaheb, Chuhan, Behlim, Kadmol, Bhangarwala, Patel, and Chameli. Each of the clan is equal status, and intermarry. They practice both cross cousin and parallel-cousin marriages. The Vyapari are essentially a community engaged in trade, and many have left Gujarat and settled in Mumbai for this purpose. Like other Muslim mercantile castes of Gujarat, such as the Memon and Khoja, they are strong believers in communal organizations. Their main caste association is the Viramgan Bepari Jamaat. They are fairly orthodox Sunni Muslims, with many being members of the reformist Tableeghi Jamat.

See also

Gujarati Muslims

References 

Social groups of Pakistan
Social groups of Gujarat
Muslim communities of India
Muslim communities of Gujarat